Sindiswa Dlathu (born January 4, 1974) is a South African actress and musician. She is well known for portraying Thandaza Mokoena on Muvhango, a role she played from the show's inception in 1997 until her departure in 2018.

Dlathu left Muvhango to play a leading role in the telenovela The River, where she plays the role of Lindiwe Dlamini - Dikana, a fierce woman, who would do anything to protect her wealth and maintain her lavish lifestyle.

Career
Dlathu was cast as the lead role's understudy in the stage version of Sarafina!. In the screen version, she worked alongside Whoopi Goldberg and was commissioned as an assistant choreographer to Michael Peters. In 1988, with the second cast led by Seipati Sothoane whom Sindi understudied. When the play went on tour, she stayed behind and did Township fever in 1989–1990 touring the US with the play for a year.

Dlathu then returned to school after four years of being with Mbongeni Ngema's committed artists. She completed her matric in 1996, and then went back to performing arts, stage plays in 1997 she was in the FNB Vita Award-winning Game, where she performed with Mary Twala, Abigail Kubeka, and the late Nomhle Nkonyeni.

She won the award for favourite actress at the 2020 DStv Mzansi Viewers' Choice Awards.

Dlathu, as Lindiwe Dlamini-Dikana from The River, appeared in a crossover episode of The Queen as the friend of the lead female character, Harriet Khoza - Sebata.

In 2021, she won SAFTA award in Best Actress category for her role of Lindiwe in The River.

Filmography

References

External links

 http://www.capetown.gov.za/en/smartcape/Peopleofnote/pages/smartcapestd.aspx?pid=634
 http://imzansi.co.za/muvhangos-thandaza-sick-again/

Living people
South African stage actresses
South African soap opera actresses
1974 births